Martin Clunes: Islands of Australia (also known as Islands of Oz) is a three part Australian documentary television series produced by Prospero Productions for the Seven Network. The series is hosted by Martin Clunes and will follow Clunes exploring various islands off the Australian mainland.

Background
The program received funding from Screen Australia in December 2013. The series is produced by Prospero Productions and Buffalo Pictures, and produced by Julia Redwood, Ed Punchard, Bill Jones and Philippa Braithwaite. The series is an adaptation of Islands of Britain, also starring Clunes and produced by Buffalo Pictures.

Filming began in 2016.

Broadcast
The series debuted on the Seven Network on 7 October 2016.

DVD
In the UK the DVD of the series was released in March 2017

Episodes

References 

2016 Australian television series debuts
Seven Network original programming
English-language television shows
2010s Australian documentary television series